Quridar (also Romanized as Qūrīdar; also known as Kā’īdar, Karīdar, Kridar, Qarīdar, Qorīdar, and Qorūdar) is a village in Amirabad Rural District, Muchesh District, Kamyaran County, Kurdistan Province, Iran. At the 2006 census, its population was 221, in 47 families. The village is populated by Kurds.

References 

Towns and villages in Kamyaran County
Kurdish settlements in Kurdistan Province